The Wolfman is a 2010 American period horror film directed by Joe Johnston, from a screenplay by Andrew Kevin Walker and David Self. A remake of the 1941 film The Wolf Man, it stars Benicio del Toro (who also produces), Anthony Hopkins, Emily Blunt and Hugo Weaving. In the film, after his brother is brutally murdered, an actor based in America named Lawrence Talbot (del Toro) returns to his ancestral homeland in England where he is bitten by a werewolf and cursed to become one.

Mark Romanek was originally attached to direct the film but left weeks before filming due to creative differences and budgetary issues. Johnston was hired four weeks before principal photography, under the impression he could shoot the film in 80 days as Universal intended. However, re-shoots extended production, inflated the budget, and delayed the film's release several times. The film underwent numerous alternative versions during post-production. Danny Elfman was briefly replaced by Paul Haslinger as the film's composer, however, the studio reverted to Elfman's previously completed score a month before the film's release after finding Haslinger's electronic-based score unsuitable.

The Wolfman was theatrically released on February 12, 2010, by Universal Pictures to negative reviews although the makeup received praise. The film was also a box office bomb, grossing $142.6 million against a production budget of $150 million. Despite the film's failure, Rick Baker and make-up effects supervisor Dave Elsey won the Academy Award for Best Makeup at the 83rd Academy Awards for their work.

Plot
In 1891, Ben Talbot is attacked in the woods by a wolf-like humanoid. His brother, Shakespearean actor Lawrence Talbot, returns home after receiving a letter from Ben's fiancée Gwen Conliffe informing him of Ben's disappearance. Lawrence reunites with his estranged father Sir John, who informs him that Ben's body has already been found mutilated.

At a local pub, Lawrence overhears the locals believing it to be a wild animal. However, many blame Romani who are camped outside the town. Another claims there was a similar murder 25 years earlier; a werewolf was the suspected killer. Lawrence has flashbacks as he tours his family's home where his mother Solana seemingly committed suicide when he was a boy. Lawrence saw his father standing over her dead body; he was sent to Lambeth Hospital in London for a year, having suffered from delusions connected to the event.

Lawrence visits the Romani during a full moon. The local townspeople raid the camp to confiscate a dancing bear they believe is the killer. The werewolf then attacks the camp, killing several Romani and townspeople before biting Lawrence and escaping. A Romani woman named Maleva sutures Lawrence's shoulder wounds, but another Romani insists the now-cursed Lawrence should be killed before he kills others. Maleva refuses, saying he is still a man and only a loved one can release him.

After a night of fever dreams, Lawrence recovers with unnatural speed and develops heightened vitality and senses. Inspector Francis Aberline arrives to investigate, suspecting Lawrence is responsible based on his mental history. Terrified of possibly harming Gwen, Lawrence sends her to London. He follows Sir John to Solana's crypt, where Sir John locks himself in a room and gives his son a cryptic warning. Lawrence undergoes a painful transformation into a werewolf before running off into the woods and killing a group of local hunters.

The next morning, Aberline and the police arrest Lawrence. Taken back to Lambeth, Lawrence is subjected to advanced treatments overseen by the sadistic Dr. Hoenneger. Sir John visits Lawrence; explaining 25 years ago during a hunting expedition the Hindukush  in India, he was bitten by a feral boy infected with lycanthropy. Sir John was the werewolf who bit Lawrence and is responsible for the recent murders, including Solana and Ben. He made Singh lock him up every full moon night and contemplated suicide for years. Driven insane by his condition, Sir John has come to embrace his curse and has decided to let himself loose during his transformations. He informs Lawrence the moon will be full and leaves a razor in case Lawrence contemplates suicide.

By nightfall, Dr. Hoenneger conducts an evening lecture with Lawrence as a case study. Lawrence attempts to warn the attendees of the impending danger, but they laugh it off and continue. Transforming once more, Lawrence kills Dr. Hoenegger and a few orderlies before he escapes and goes on a rampage. The next day, Lawrence visits Gwen's antique shop for help. They admit their love for each other and share a passionate kiss. Aberline waits outside Talbot Hall, arming himself and accompanying policemen with silver bullets. Gwen searches for Maleva hoping to cure Lawrence, but Maleva tells her there isn't any cure and Lawrence must die.

Lawrence arrives at Talbot Hall, where Sir John has killed Singh and one of Aberline's men. He loads a gun with Singh's silver bullets and attempts to shoot Sir John. Unfortunately, he realizes too late Sir John had removed the powder from the cartridges years ago. As the two struggle, with Sir John striking Lawrence with a silver cane, the full moon arises and the Talbots transform into werewolves. They set Talbot Hall on fire during their fight. Sir John initially gains the upper hand, wounding Lawrence. However, the latter manages to kick his deranged father into the fireplace and ultimately decapitates his father, avenging the deaths of his mother and brother.

Still in his werewolf form, Lawrence pursues Gwen and corners her above a gorge. She pleads with Lawrence, and his consciousness recognizes her. The police and hunters approach, distracting Lawrence long enough for Gwen to fatally shoot him with Aberline's gun. Lawrence reverts to human form; thanking Gwen for setting him free and dies in her arms. As Talbot Hall burns, Aberline is horrified with the knowledge he was bitten by Lawrence as he watches the full moon come into view, foreshadowing his imminent fate in becoming the next werewolf.

Cast

Max von Sydow appears as an elderly man who gives Lawrence the wolf-head cane; his part was cut from the theatrical film but is restored in the unrated director's cut. Make-up effects creator Rick Baker makes a cameo appearance as the Romani man who is the first killed. The Wolfman's howl incorporated elements from rock singers Gene Simmons and David Lee Roth, as well as opera singers and animal impersonators.

Production

Development

In March 2006, Universal Pictures announced the remake of The Wolf Man with actor Benicio del Toro, a huge fan of the original and collector of Wolf Man memorabilia, in the lead role. Screenwriter Andrew Kevin Walker was attached to the screenplay, developing the original film's story to include additional characters as well as plot points that would take advantage of modern visual effects. Del Toro also looked towards Werewolf of London and The Curse of the Werewolf for inspiration.

In February 2007, director Mark Romanek was attached to helm The Wolfman. Romanek's original vision was to "infuse a balance of cinema in a popcorn movie scenario", stating, "When there’s a certain amount of money involved, these things make studios and producers a little nervous.  They don’t necessarily understand it or they feel that the balance will swing too far to something esoteric, and we could never come to an agreement on the right balance for that type of thing.  Ultimately it made more sense for them to find a director that was gonna fulfill their idea of the film that they wanted, and we just sort of parted ways."

In January 2008, Romanek left the project because of creative differences. Brett Ratner emerged as a frontrunner to replace Romanek, but the studio also met with Frank Darabont, James Mangold and Joe Johnston. They were also interested in Bill Condon, and Martin Campbell was interested. Johnston was hired to direct on 3 February 2008, and the film's shooting schedule and budget remained as intended. Johnston hired David Self to rewrite the script.

Filming
Shooting took place from 3 March to 23 June 2008, in Britain. At that time the film was budgeted at US$85 million. They shot at Pinewood Studios in Buckinghamshire, Chatsworth in Derbyshire and Castle Combe in Wiltshire. They transformed Chatsworth House by adding weeds, dead grass and ivy. They also shot in Lacock in Wiltshire, a village conserved by the National Trust for Places of Historic Interest or Natural Beauty, for a day (the butcher's barn and external shots). Universal donated £5,000 to the village, in return for filming in the tithe barn for a scene involving frozen corpses. A funeral scene was also shot beside the Temple of Ancient Virtue at Stowe House, with the temple coated in false ivy and copious amounts of smoke/mist floating over the setting. There were also scenes filmed on Dartmoor, Devon at Foggintor Quarry. Pick-ups at Pinewood were conducted in May 2009.

The cast and crew were back on location re-shooting the film in the grounds of the Old Royal Naval College and park in Greenwich over the weekends of 22-25 and 30–31 May 2009. The purpose of the re-shoots was to change the way one werewolf looked in the film. Previously, it stood on two legs, but now, it stands on four. Also, an action scene was added between "the Wolf Man and the Werewolf" according to second unit director Vic Armstrong.

Visual effects

Rick Baker created the make-up for The Wolfman. When he heard Universal was remaking the film, he eagerly pursued it, as both The Wolf Man and Frankenstein inspired him to become a make-up artist as a child. He acknowledged transforming del Toro was not difficult because he is a hairy man: "Going from Benicio to Benicio as the Wolf Man isn't a really extreme difference. Like when I did An American Werewolf in London, we went from this naked man to a four-legged hound from Hell, and we had a lot of room to go from the transformation and do a lot of really extreme things. Here we have Benicio del Toro, who's practically the Wolf Man already, to Benicio del Toro with more hair and bigger teeth."

Baker and del Toro were adamant about the design resembling the make-up created by Jack Pierce for the 1941 film, but Romanek went through thousands of concept art renderings. When Johnston signed on, Baker returned to his second design, which is the finished result. The make-up took three hours to apply, and one hour to remove. New pieces of latex prosthetic makeup and loose hair was applied to del Toro's face each day, while several dentures and wigs were created in case some were damaged. Baker said the transformation would likely be computer-generated, which disappointed him as he would not be involved and felt it would look unrealistic (as the animators did not have his knowledge of the design). Director Joe Johnston explained that joining the film three weeks before photography placed limitations on his ability to film without using CG effects. He has stated, “I recognised that there were things that I was going to be able to do from the beginning to the end, and things that I had to rely on post-production for." In reference to filming Benicio del Toro's actual transformation into the Wolfman, Johnston further explained, "I decided to basically shoot just Benicio, in the sequence where he transforms and decide in post-production what I wanted the transformation to be. That was really my main reason [for using CG]; it gave me so much more flexibility." In February 2009, ZBrush art of the transformation by Baker leaked online. In addition to the film, at the 2009 Halloween Horror Nights,  Universal Studios Florida added The Wolfman to the event.

Music
Danny Elfman was reported to have written a dark, melodic, and moody score for The Wolfman, which was rejected by the studio after the film was cut down half an hour in length and the music became too "wall-to-wall", creating what Johnston called too much repetition. Due to his not being able to come back and re-score (because he was contractually obligated to work on Tim Burton's Alice in Wonderland feature film), the producers decided that, rather than expand on his ideas with a new composer – a path that they would eventually take –, they would instead attempt a completely different approach with a different composer, which would include extensive re-shooting of scenes.

The idea was to quicken the pace and strike a similar tone to the successful Underworld film series, turning a slow-paced story into a much faster one. Paul Haslinger subsequently wrote an electronic contemporary incarnation of The Wolfman score, which the studio quickly realised was not appropriate for the late 19th-century Gothic setting. Elfman's previously recorded original score is, as a result, the one that is used in the final film. Although Elfman's original recording was used in the final film, several additional composers (Conrad Pope, Edward Shearmur and Thomas Lindgren) were brought in to shape Elfman's score to fit the final cut of the film, as well as compose new material.

Danny Elfman's version of The Wolfman score was officially released on 23 February, 11 days after the film's release. This is actually the original score Elfman made for the earlier cut of The Wolfman before it was temporarily rejected. Thus, the music in the final film was mostly different from the original work on the CD release, which reflected the first incarnation of the score. A believed-to-be sample of Haslinger's rejected score was released around the same time, but was ultimately confirmed as false by record producer Ford A. Thaxton and Haslinger himself.

Dark ambient musician Lustmord contributed "some sounds for the score".

Release

Merchandising
Several companies were involved in the merchandising of the film. Rubies Costumes produced both child and adult costumes. Because such costumes are sold to retailers months in advance, the Halloween costumes came out in 2009 since the film being pushed back to 2010 happened after the costumes had been shipped to retailers. Mezco Toyz produced 7 inch and 12 inch tall Wolfman action figures. They also produced replicas of the medallion from the film. In early January 2010, Mezco Toyz donated the prototypes of the toys to the Museum of the Moving Image in New York. A novelization by Jonathan Maberry was released on February 2, 2010, to coincide with the DVD re-release of the 1941 film.

Theatrical
The film was delayed several times during production and was previously scheduled to be released on November 14, 2008, February 13, 2009, April 3, 2009, and November 6, 2009. The film's first trailer was attached to Inglourious Basterds, released on August 21, 2009. The film was released on some European markets on February 10 and 11, 2010.

Home media
 
The film was released on DVD and Blu-ray on June 1, 2010. Both editions include the theatrical cut and an extended cut, restoring 17 minutes into the film. The Blu-ray Disc's special features include featurettes on the making of the film, including two alternate endings. The only special features included on the standard DVD are deleted and extended scenes. Best Buy released an exclusive 2-Disc DVD set that includes a bonus disc featuring most of the BD special features. Upon the Blu-ray's release, viewers had the opportunity to stream the original 1941 film.

In the United States and Canada, the DVD grossed $21.8 million and the Blu-ray grossed $5.9 million, totaling $27.8 million in domestic video sales.

Extended cut
The DVD/Blu-ray releases include an "unrated director's cut", featuring an additional 17 minutes of footage and the inclusion of the classic 40's era Universal logo at the beginning of the film. Johnston said the reason for deleting the 17 minutes from the theatrical cut was "to push the story along so that audiences would get to the first Wolfman transformation sooner." The extra footage contains the origin of the silver cane-sword and also the uncredited and completely removed part played by Max von Sydow who was the original owner of the cane. The character indicates that he obtained it in Gévaudan, a French province where in the 18th century villagers were attacked by an unknown beast known as the Beast of Gévaudan. Though Max von Sydow's credit is absent from the theatrical cut, there is still a credit for "Assistant to Mr. von Sydow".

Reception

Box office
The film grossed $9.9 million on its first day, and $31.5 million in its opening weekend, coming in second at the box office after the film Valentine's Day. The Wolfman grossed $62.2 million domestically and $80.5 million internationally, grossing $142.6 million worldwide. In 2014, the Los Angeles Times added the film to their list of "costliest box office flops of all time".

Critical response
On Rotten Tomatoes, the film has an approval rating of 33% based on 221 reviews, with an average rating of 4.80/10. The site's critics consensus reads: "Suitably grand and special effects-laden, The Wolfman suffers from a suspense-deficient script and a surprising lack of genuine chills." On Metacritic, the film has a score of 43 out of 100 based on 36 critic reviews, indicating "mixed or average reviews". Audiences polled by CinemaScore gave the film an average grade of "C+" on an A+ to F scale.

Film critic Roger Ebert gave the film two and a half stars out of four, praising the atmospheric locations and melodramatic scope but lamenting CGI effects that he regarded as detrimental. Peter Travers of Rolling Stone assigned the film one and a half stars out of four, concluding that "The Wolfman bites, but not — I think — in the way the filmmakers intended." Owen Glieberman of Entertainment Weekly praised Del Toro's performance as Lawrence Talbot, comparing it favourably to Lon Chaney Jr.'s, in the 1941 film.

Ronald Meyer, then-president of Universal Studios at the time of the film's release, regarded the film as "crappy" and considered it to be "One of the worst movies we ever made."

Awards

In 2010, The Wolfman won at the 37th Saturn Awards for best make-up. In 2011, make-up effects creator Rick Baker and supervisor Dave Elsey, received an Academy Award for Best Makeup at the 83rd Academy Awards.

Reboots
Universal's 2012 film Werewolf: The Beast Among Us was originally planned as a spin-off from the film but was ultimately unrelated. Universal announced that it would reboot their Universal Monsters properties as part of a shared cinematic universe, with Alex Kurtzman and Chris Morgan attached to develop the structure of the shared universe, to be known as the Dark Universe. In November 2014, Universal hired Aaron Guzikowski to write the shared universe's reboot of The Wolf Man.  In June 2016, Deadline reported that Dwayne Johnson may star as the character. In October 2016, it was reported that David Callaham was brought on board to re-write the script. The first film in the Dark Universe, however, 2017's The Mummy, flopped at the box office, ending plans for any more such films. In May 2020, following the success of The Invisible Man, it was confirmed that a new Wolf Man film had entered development at Universal with Ryan Gosling set to star in the titular role. In October 2021, Deadline reported that Derek Cianfrance will direct the reboot.

References

External links

 
 
 
 
 
 

2010 films
2010 horror films
2010s English-language films
2010s monster movies
2010s supernatural horror films
Remakes of American films
American werewolf films
British horror films
Filicide in fiction
Films about actors
Films directed by Joe Johnston
Films produced by Sean Daniel
Films produced by Scott Stuber
Films scored by Danny Elfman
Films set in 1891
Films set in country houses
Films set in London
Films shot at Pinewood Studios
Films that won the Academy Award for Best Makeup
Films with screenplays by Andrew Kevin Walker
Horror film remakes
Patricide in fiction
Period horror films
Relativity Media films
Universal Monsters
Universal Pictures films
Uxoricide in fiction
2010s American films
2010s British films